Fauls Green (or Faulsgreen) is a hamlet situated  from Prees (and lies in that parish) in rural north Shropshire, England. The placename is commonly abbreviated to Fauls.

The Fauls Holy Emmanuel church is located within the hamlet.

See also
Listed buildings in Prees

References

Acny

Villages in Shropshire